Meramec Conservation Area consists of  in southern Franklin County, Missouri. It is located southeast of the town of Sullivan and bordered to the south by Missouri Route 185 and to the west by the Meramec River and Meramec State Park.

Most of the land that comprises the Meramec Conservation Area was acquired by the state between 1925 and 1930. Historic sites at the area include the first state nursery, a Civilian Conservation Corps camp, Lone Hill fire lookout tower, and old mines. The area is hills that are mostly forested as well as a great blue heron rookery.

The Woodland Trail is a  disabled-accessible trail along the river bottom that passes by Lone Hill Onyx Cave, one of six caves in the conservation area. There is also a  CCC trail,  Reedville Loop hiking trail, and  multi-use trail open to hiking, biking, and horseback riding. Hunting, trapping, and fishing are permitted with permits and in season in most of the conservation area except for the wildlife refuge. As of December 31, 2012 all caves on public lands in Missouri, including those in Meramec Conservation Area, are closed to the general public due to white nose syndrome.

References

Protected areas of Franklin County, Missouri
Conservation Areas of Missouri
Protected areas established in 1925
1925 establishments in Missouri